The St. Thomas Tommies women's basketball team represents the University of St. Thomas, located in Saint Paul, Minnesota, in NCAA Division I as a member of the Summit League.

The Tommies made their NCAA Division I debut under then-seventeenth-year head coach Ruth Opatz Sinn for the 2021–22 season.

The team plays its games at Schoenecker Arena on its campus in St. Paul.

References

External links
 

 
St. Thomas (Minnesota) Tommies
University of St. Thomas (Minnesota)